Performance management (PM) is the process of ensuring that a set of activities and outputs meets an organization's goals in an effective and efficient manner. Performance management can focus on the performance of a whole organization, a department, an employee, or the processes in place to manage particular tasks. Performance management standards are generally organized and disseminated by senior leadership at an organization and by task owners, and may include specifying tasks and outcomes of a job, providing timely feedback and coaching, comparing employees' actual performance and behaviors with desired performance and behaviors, instituting rewards, etc. It is necessary to outline the role of each individual in the organization in terms of functions and responsibilities to ensure that performance management is successful.

Application
Performance management principles are used most often in the workplace and can be applied wherever people interact with their environments to produce desired effects—schools, churches, community meetings, sports teams, health settings, governmental agencies, social events, and even political settings.

The way performance management is applied is important in getting the most out of the group. It can have a positive impact on how employees perform on a day-to-day basis. In order to avoid a negative impact, it must be applied in a way that does not encourage internal competition, but rather teamwork, cooperation, and trust. This is done through an implementation process of clarifying the work that has to be done, setting goals and establishing a performance plan, frequently providing coaching, conducting a formal review, and recognizing and rewarding top performance. 

Managers use performance management to align company goals with the goals of teams and employees in an effort to increase efficiency, productivity, and profitability. Performance management guidelines stipulate clearly the activities and outcomes by which employees and teams are evaluated during performance appraisal.Many types of organization use performance management systems (PMS) to evaluate their business according to their targets, objectives, and goals to achieve the vision of their organization. For example research institute may use PMS to evaluate their research success in achieving specific development targets in line with the institute vision. Complex multifaceted performance drivers such as societal contribution of research may be evaluated along with many other complex performance drivers like research commercialization, research collaborations, in focus of many development areas such as commercial agriculture sector. In such cases research institute may use data-driven real-time PMS to deal with such complex performance management challenges and to be on track of research practices towards development needs of a country in achieving innovations for development of agriculture sector.

To apply performance management principles, a commitment analysis is completed first to create a mission statement for each job. The mission statement is a job definition in terms of purpose, customers, product, and scope. This analysis is used to determine the continuous key objectives and performance standards for each job position.

Following the commitment analysis is the work analysis of a particular job in terms of the reporting structure and job description. If a job description is not available, then a systems analysis is completed to create a job description. This analysis is used to determine the continuous critical objectives and performance standards for each job.

Werner Erhard, Michael C. Jensen, and their colleagues developed a new approach to improving performance in organizations. Their model is used to stress how the constraints imposed by one's own worldview can impede cognitive abilities that would otherwise be available. Their work delves into the source of performance, which is not accessible by mere linear cause-and-effect analysis. They assert that the level of performance people achieve correlates with how work situations occur to them and that language (including what is said and unsaid in conversations) plays a major role in how situations occur to the performer. They assert that substantial gains in performance are more likely to be achieved by management understanding how employees perceive the world and then encouraging and implementing changes that make sense to employees' worldview.

Benefits of performance management
Managing employee or system performance and aligning their objectives facilitates the effective delivery of strategic and operational goals. Some proponents argue there is a clear and immediate correlation between using performance management programs or software and improved business and organizational results. In the public sector, the effects of performance management systems have differed from positive to negative, suggesting that differences in the characteristics of performance management systems and the contexts into which they are implemented play an important role to the success or failure of performance management.

For employee performance management, using integrated software, rather than a spreadsheet-based recording system, may deliver a return on investment through a range of direct and indirect sales benefits, operational efficiency benefits, and by unlocking the latent potential in every employee workday (i.e., the time they spend not actually doing their job). Benefits may include:

Direct financial gain
 Grow sales
 Reduce costs in the organization
 Stop project overruns
 Aligns the organization directly behind the CEO's goals
 Decreases the time it takes to create strategic or operational changes by communicating the changes through a new set of goals

Motivated workforce
 Optimizes incentive plans to specific goals for over achievement, not just business as usual
 Improves employee engagement because everyone understands how they are directly contributing to the organizations high-level goals
 Create transparency in the achievement of goals
 High confidence in bonus payment process
 Professional development programs are better aligned directly to achieving business level goals

Improved management control
 Flexible, responsive to management needs
 Displays data relationships
 Helps audit / comply with legislative requirement
 Simplifies communication of strategic goals scenario planning
 Provides well documented and communicated process documentation

How performance management can fail

Employees who question how fair the performance management system is will discredit its effectiveness. An example of this would be a high level of internal competition within the performance management system. This will cause those who do not get rewarded to be disgruntled with the process. Additionally, without proper implementation in the planning of the performance management system, employees may view the process as something they must have compliance with. This will result in a less proactive and more inaccurate representation of the performance of an employee. Managers are expected to take performance management seriously, and without effective management the overall functionality of the program will be lacking. A well-managed, well-constructed plan can be beneficial for companies and employees, but the system is not perfected.

Organizational development
In organizational development (OD), performance can be thought of as Actual Results vs Desired Results. Any discrepancy, where Actual is less than Desired, could constitute the performance improvement zone. Performance management and improvement can be thought of as a cycle:
Performance planning where goals and objectives are established
Performance coaching where a manager intervenes to give feedback and adjust performance
Performance appraisal where individual performance is formally documented and feedback delivered

A performance problem is any gap between Desired Results and Actual Results.  Performance improvement is any effort targeted at closing the gap between Actual Results and Desired Results.

Other organizational development definitions are slightly different. The U.S. Office of Personnel Management (OPM) indicates that Performance Management consists of a system or process whereby:
 Work is planned and expectations are set
 Performance of work is monitored
 Staff ability to perform is developed and enhanced
 Performance is rated or measured and the ratings summarized
 Top performance is rewarded.

Implementation
Performance management is the term used to refer to activities, tools, processes, and programs that companies create or apply to manage the performance of individual employees, teams, departments, and other organizational units within their organizational influence. In contrast, performance appraisal refers to the act of appraising or evaluating performance during a given performance period to determine how well an employee, a vendor or an organizational unit has performed relative to agreed objectives or goals, and this is only one of many important activities within the overall concept of performance management.

At the workplace, performance management is implemented by employees with supervisory roles. Normally, the goal of managing performance is to allow individual employees to find out how well they had performed relative to performance targets or key performance indicators (KPIs) during a specific performance period from their supervisors and managers.

An organization-wide 360-degree feedback process integrated into its culture can be a powerful tool for communicating and instituting change, rapidly touching all members of the organization when new markets, strategies, values and structures are introduced into the system.

Organizations and companies typically manage employee performance over a formal 12-month period (otherwise known as the formal company performance period).

The results of performance management exercises are used in:
 Employee development planning to select the most appropriate and suitable development intervention to improve employees' knowledge, skills and behavior
 Factual basis for compensation and rewards (pay raise & bonuses being the most common)
 Factual basis in consideration with other factors for mobility (Example: transfers and promotions)
Each year companies spend millions on their performance management systems. In order for performance management to be successful, businesses must continue to adapt their system to correct their current deficiencies. Some aspects may resonate more with employees compared to others (e.g., goal setting or performance bonuses). Effective management will set up a performance management system that is distinctive and consistent. The goal is to continue to alter the system to have higher employee engagement and increase their employees’ performance at work. In turn, companies hope this results in less turnover and creates a better workplace environment.

See also
 Behavioral systems analysis
 Operational performance management
 Organizational behavior management
 PDCA
 Performance measurement
 Stack ranking
 Strategy Markup Language and particularly StratML Part 2, Performance Plans and Reports

References

Further reading
 
 Business Intelligence and Performance Management: Theory, Systems, and Industrial Applications, P. Rausch, A. Sheta, A. Ayesh (Eds.), Springer Verlag U.K., 2013, . 
 Performance Management - Integrating Strategy Execution, Methodologies, Risk, and Analytics. Gary Cokins, John Wiley & Sons, Inc. 2009. 
 Journal of Organizational Behavior Management, Routledge Taylor & Francis Group. Published quarterly. 2009.
 Handbook of Organizational Performance, Thomas C. Mawhinney, William K. Redmon & Carl Merle Johnson. Routledge. 2001.
 Improving Performance: How to Manage the White Space in the Organization Chart, Geary A. Rummler & Alan P. Brache. Jossey-Bass; 2nd edition. 1995.
 Human Competence: Engineering Worthy Performance, Thomas F. Gilbert. Pfeiffer. 1996.
 The Values-Based Safety Process: Improving Your Safety Culture with Behavior-Based Safety, Terry E. McSween. John Wiley & Sons. 1995.
 Performance-based Instruction: Linking Training to Business Results, Dale Brethower & Karolyn Smalley. Pfeiffer; Har/Dis edition. 1998.
 Handbook of Applied Behavior Analysis, John Austin & James E. Carr. Context Press. 2000.
 Managing for Performance, Alasdair A. K. White. Piatkus Books, 1995
 

 
Management by type